Hiten is an Indian masculine given name. Notable people with the name include:

Hiten Tejwani (born 1974), Indian actor
Hiten Paintal (born 1982), Indian actor
Hiten Kumar, Indian actor
Hiten Barman, Indian politician
Hiten Dalal

Indian masculine given names